Beaster is Sugar's 1993 EP. Its songs were recorded at the same time as the band's acclaimed first album, Copper Blue. However, the EP has a much denser, heavier sound, closer in spirit to frontman Bob Mould's earlier band Hüsker Dü than to Copper Blue. "Lyrically it's so unnerving for me to listen to it…" said Mould. "Musically it's harder, it's a little looser. Lyrically, it's a lot wilder than Copper Blue… Copper Blue was such a great pop record that I just saw this as like the evil twin."

The loosely conceptual work is built around religious imagery, and was even released during Holy Week before Easter in 1993. "I still don't know what it's all about," said Mould after its release. "The Jesus thing everybody picks up on – those are words that are not used lightly. Just the notion of somebody who can do no wrong who eventually gets hung [sic] for doing no wrong. I think that everyone feels like a martyr sometimes."

Background
Bob Mould said of Beaster:

Reception

"Audibly a disciple of Hendrix, McGuinn and Page, and propelled by the supreme engine room of bassist David Barbe and drummer Malcolm Travis, Mould's sound is dense but never turgid," wrote Mat Snow for Q. "Better still, his melodic instinct to head for the heights of epiphany remains intact; though on the face of it not a song here should raise even the thinnest wintry smile, tune-wise they beam with vitality and engagement."

A retrospective review in Q maintained the 4|5 rating. "Mould called Beaster 'the bad Sugar' (destined, sadly, to be followed by the 'crap Sugar' of File Under: Easy Listening)," wrote Danny Eccleston, "and alongside his solo Workbook, it's about the best thing in his bulging portfolio."

"It starts with an acoustic guitar," wrote David Cavanagh for Select, "achieves limitless levels of beauty in its 30 minutes and ends with the most gorgeous piece of music Bob Mould has been involved with since his heart-stopping solo on 'Green Eyes' off Flip Your Wig."

"Rarely has a band rocked out with such bleak intensity and utter conviction," opined The Times. "A vast cathedral of noise and despair, erected and demolished in half an hour flat, this is an album which has to be heard to be believed."

"Sugar are about the turmoil of the interior life," observed Melody Maker, "which is maybe why an album like Beaster is best listened to loud on the headphones at home rather than live."

"The dark but insidiously catchy companion to Copper Blue confirms what those in the know had predicted," concluded The Daily Telegraph, "Sugar are definitely The Next Big Thing."

Track listing

DVD tracks 2 to 5 were filmed live At Finsbury Park 13 June 1993

Personnel
All songs written by Bob Mould and published by Granary Music (BMI)
 Bob Mould - Guitars, Vocals, Keyboards, Percussion
 David Barbe - Bass
 Malcolm Travis - Drums, Percussion

Produced & engineered by Bob Mould and Lou Giordano. Recorded at The Outpost, Stoughton, MA. Mixed at Carriage House, Stamford, CT
 Mix assistant: Tom Bender
 Mastered by Howie Weinberg at Masterdisk, New York
 Art direction: Bob Mould/Kevin O'Neill
 Photography: Sandra-Lee Phipps & Russell Kaye

Charts

Album

Note
AChart placing refers to 2012 release Copper Blue/Beaster.

Single

References

External links 
 Granary Music Bob Mould's thoughts on the making of Beaster

1993 EPs
Sugar (American band) albums
Albums produced by Bob Mould
Albums produced by Lou Giordano
Rykodisc EPs